Double Experience is a rock band based in Ottawa, Ontario that was formed in the summer of 2011. The band consists of vocalist and front man Ian Nichols and guitarist Brock Tinsley.

History

Formation and beginnings
Double Experience's roots reach back into the late 2011 when guitarist Brock Tinsley and vocalist Ian Nichols began writing and performing together under the name Colfax.

In 2014,  the name Double Experience was adopted by members Nichols, Tinsley, drummer Kenny Saunders and bassist Tim Kealey. While explaining the name change in an interview, the band claimed there were "as many legal implications appearing as there were bands with the name 'Colfax'."

721835 (2014–2015)
In January 2014, Double Experience released the debut single, "Who the Hell?", consisting of footage the band had shot on their previous tours as Colfax. The band had been working on songs for 721835 since the winter of 2012. During this time, Double Experience released their music exclusively on trading cards to encourage people physically interacting with the band.

In May 2014, Double Experience released advance physical copies of the album, complete with four additional tracks, as a tour exclusive.

An animated video for the album's second single, "Here's Y" was released on June 17.

721835 was released on August 1, 2014. In the same month, the band continued returned to the United Kingdom, eventually meeting and performing with Dafydd Cartwright. Tinsley stated that the tour was "not only the best of our three [tours] over here, but one of the best of our young careers so far." Cartwright would continue to drum for Double Experience.

Unsaved Progress (2015–2017)
In the months that followed, Double Experience continued to tour Canada and the UK in support of 721835. Some shows included performances inside video game stores and museums

The band returned to Warrior Sound studios in the fall of 2015. By this time, the band had performed over 500 shows across 16 countries. Nichols later noted that Unsaved Progress was "...the culmination of several years of touring, writing, working across the Atlantic Ocean" and "took a tremendous amount of planning, effort, and perseverance."

On February 18, 2016, Double Experience debuted the album's first single, "So Fine".

In the fall of 2016, Double Experience embarked on "The Lure Tour", which was themed around the mobile game Pokémon GO, utilizing outfits and physical recreations of in-game items such as a Poke-stop.

On February 1, 2017, Double Experience released their music video for "Godzilla".

Rock (Geology) (2017-2019)
After the release of Unsaved Progress, Nichols and Tinsley briefly toured in a tribute band of The Police.

During the summer of 2017, Double Experience were involved in the inaugural Nerdstock music festival via Montreal Comiccon, joining the Ned Flanders-centric metal band Okilly Dokilly.

On November 9, 2017, Double Experience released "The Pilot", their first single since Unsaved Progress.

During this tour, the band revealed their next single for Rock (Geology), "AI Freaks Me Out", which was subsequently released on February 12, 2018. To celebrate the release of the single, Double Experience aligned with Ingenium for an event "to raise funds for science, technology, engineering, arts, and math learning programs" at the Canada Science and Technology Museum in their hometown of Ottawa, Ontario. On March 22, the band released the video for "AI Freaks Me Out", which depicts Nichols performing as Max Headroom.

On April 27, Double Experience released "Oh Listener Mine" as a follow-up to "The Glimmer Shot". The lyrics of the song were inspired by deep lore of Destiny and the species of wish-granting dragons known as Ahamkara.

By the end of 2018, Double Experience signed with Drakkar Entertainment.

On March 1, 2019, Double Experience released their first single through Drakkar Entertainment, "Love is Not Just Talk"

During the month of May, Double Experience joined Danko Jones on their Ontario tour dates

Alignments (2019-present)
On Nov 1, 2019, Double Experience announced Alignments; a trilogy of EPs released in November, January and March, culminating in a full-length album on April 24, 2020. Alignments would be the first Double Experience release distributed by Drakkar Entertainment and Soulfood.

On March 27, 2020, Bloody Disgusting debuted the music video for "Your Biggest Fan". The video was an homage to the film adaptation of Misery. Alignments was released on Friday April 24, 2020.

On April 28, 2021, Double Experience received two Capital Music Awards nominations for "Group of the Year" and "Album of the Year".

Band members
Current members
 Ian Nichols - vocals, bass 
 Brock Tinsley - guitars

Former members
 Kenny Saunders - drums (2014)
 Tim Kealey - bass (2014)
 Dafydd Cartwright - drums (2016-2017)

Touring members
 James Reid - drums (2015,2017)

Timeline

Discography
Studio albums
2014: 721835
2016: Unsaved Progress
2017: Rock (Geology)
2020: Alignments

Music videos
2014: "Who the Hell?"
2016: "So Fine"
2017: "Godzilla"
2017: "The Pilot"
2018: "AI Freaks Me Out"
2019: "New Me"

References

Canadian rock music groups
Musical groups from Ottawa
Musical groups established in 2014
2014 establishments in Ontario